Wally Masur defeated Bill Scanlon 6–4, 7–6 to secure the title.

Seeds

  Ramesh Krishnan (quarterfinals)
  Amos Mansdorf (quarterfinals)
 n/a
  Matt Anger (second round)
  Eddie Edwards (first round)
  Broderick Dyke (second round)
  Wally Masur (champion)
  Nduka Odizor (semifinals)

Draw

Finals

Top half

Bottom half

External links
 1987 South Australian Open draw 

Singles